Camigliano is a comune (municipality) in the Province of Caserta in the Italian region Campania, located about  north of Naples and about  northwest of Caserta.

Camigliano borders the following municipalities: Bellona, Formicola, Giano Vetusto, Pastorano, Pontelatone, Vitulazio.
The mayor of Camigliano is Vincenzo Cenname, elected in 2011.

References

External links
 Official website

Cities and towns in Campania